Elmer H. Baumann (born February 15, 1902) was an American electrician from Milwaukee who served one term (1927–1928) as a Socialist member of the Wisconsin State Assembly representing Milwaukee County's 11th Assembly district (the 11th and 24th wards of the City of Milwaukee).

Background 
He was born February 15, 1902, in Milwaukee and was educated in public grade schools. He became an electrician and a member of the International Brotherhood of Electrical Workers, served as assistant business agent of his local union in 1925, and as a delegate to the 1925 international convention of the IBEW in Seattle, Washington. He held various offices in the Milwaukee labor movement. and at the time of his election was vice-president of IBEW Local 494.

In the Assembly 
He had never held public office until his successful 1926 bid for the Assembly to replace fellow Socialist Olaf C. Olsen. Due to the failure of his only opponent to complete necessary paperwork, he ran unopposed (one of three Socialists to run unopposed in the 1926 election). He was assigned to the Assembly's standing committee on education.

He was defeated in his 1928 bid for re-election by Republican Alex Chmurski, who polled 3358 votes to 3056 for Democrat George Brier and 2989 for Baumann.

After the Assembly 
He served for some time on the Milwaukee Board of School Directors, and died in March 1935 while seeking re-election to that office, in which he was seen as a strong advocate for higher pay for teachers and educational staff.

References 

1902 births
1935 deaths
American trade union leaders
American electricians
Members of the Wisconsin State Assembly
Politicians from Milwaukee
Socialist Party of America politicians from Wisconsin
School board members in Wisconsin
20th-century American politicians